BelToll is a system of toll roads operating in the Republic of Belarus.

The commercial operation of the BelToll toll collection system began on 1 August 2013. As of today, Belarus operates 1,726 kilometers of national toll roads.

Operating principle 
BelToll makes use of a Dedicated Short Range Communication (DSRC) solution that is operated in many countries of the world. The technology enables road users to pay toll without stopping at toll plazas (toll bars).

Along toll roads there are tolling stations (metal gantries) fitted with receiver/transmitters which enable data exchange between on-board units (OBU) mounted on the windscreen of vehicles.

When drivers pass underneath a tolling station the electronic toll collection system will automatically draw money from a driver’s OBU account. An account is created upon user registration in the system and receipt of an OBU.

There is no need either to slow down or choose a specific lane when passing underneath the tolling stations. The system allows multi-lane free-flow traffic.

List of toll roads

Who should pay 
 Drivers of motor vehicles with a maximum laden weight exceeding 3.5 tonnes; 
 Drivers of motor vehicles with a maximum laden weight not exceeding 3.5 tonnes registered outside the Eurasian Economic Union (Belarus, Russia, Kazakhstan, Armenia, Kyrgyzstan). 
Drivers of the following vehicles are exempt from toll payment when using the BelToll road network:
 Vehicles registered in the Eurasian Economic Union member states with a maximum laden weight of 3.5 tonnes and less and trailers towed by such vehicles;
 Mopeds and motorcycles;
 Wheeled tractors and self-propelled vehicles registered in the Republic of Belarus;
 Special operation vehicles;
 Vehicles used for the purposes of ensuring the defensive capacity and law enforcement;
 Fixed-route vehicles used for urban transportation of passengers;
 Vehicles used for emergency response or transportation of humanitarian aid to the population of the Republic of Belarus and other countries.
President of the Republic of Belarus Alexander Lukashenko signed special Decree No. 349 of 10 August 2015 to exempt from toll vehicles registered in the Donetsk and Lugansk Regions of Ukraine with a maximum laden weight not exceeding 3.5 tonnes and their trailers.

http://president.gov.by/ru/news_ru/view/kommentarij-k-ukazu-349-ot-10-avgusta-2015-g-11914/

http://www.beltoll.by/index.php/news/812-on-presidential-decree-349

Toll rates

Toll payment 
To use the network of toll roads it is necessary to equip a vehicle with an on-board unit (OBU). OBUs are available with a deposit of EUR 20 for motor vehicles with a maximum laden weight not exceeding 3.5 tonnes and EUR 50 for motor vehicles with a maximum laden weight of over 3.5 tonnes.

Toll payment can be made in cash (rubels), Visa, MasterCard (any currency), and BelKart. Further, fuel cards, including E100, Eurowag, euroShell, Berlio, and Belorusneft can be used for toll payments.

Receiving an OBU 
OBUs are available from a BelToll customer services points which are located next to automobile border-crossing points, along toll roads, and in all of the region centers of Belarus. They operate on a 24/7 basis. An OBU is attached to the windscreen, and whenever a vehicle passes under a gantry, the required amount is written off from the OBU account.

Some vehicles have so-called metallic (athermic) windscreens, and when driving such a vehicle, a driver should request information from the manufacturer to identify areas on the windscreen free from metal coating and attach an OBU according to the OBU User Manual.

Each time a vehicle equipped with an OBU passes through a tolling gantry, the OBU gives an acoustic signal. If there is no signal or there is more than one signal, a driver is recommended to stop using the toll road and refer to the nearest customer services point, having called the hotline at +375 172 798 798 and registered his/her inquiry.

Substitution fee 
In case of any violation of the procedure for the collection of toll, a Substitution Fee shall be paid by the owner (proprietor) of a vehicle.

The following events shall be regarded as violations of the toll collection procedure:

Failure to Pay
 absence of an OBU in a vehicle subject to toll payment;
 absence of a toll payment record on an OBU;
 use of an out-of-service OBU;
 use of an OBU that cannot be used to pay in compliance with the established procedure;
 use of an OBU in violation of technical operation rules;
 unlawful use of an OBU designed for exempted vehicles.
Short Payment
 use of an BU configured for fewer axles than the number prescribed by the relevant User     Manual for the vehicle; 
 use of an OBU that is not personalized for the vehicle.
Amounts of Substitution Fees payable for the use of toll roads in the Republic of Belarus
 Vehicles with a maximum laden weight not exceeding 3.5 tonnes: failure to pay — EUR 100; short payment — EUR 50;
 Vehicles with a maximum laden weight exceeding 3.5 tonnes: failure to pay — EUR 260; short payment — EUR 130.

References

External links 
 BelToll official site

Roads in Belarus
Belarus
Road transport in Belarus